Sturgeon River is a  river in the U.S. state of Michigan, flowing mostly northward through Otsego and Cheboygan counties. 
 
It flows into Burt Lake in the community of Indian River.

With an average descent of 14 feet per mile, the Sturgeon River is the fastest river in Michigan's Lower Peninsula. The water is crystal-clear since it begins as a spring-fed stream. The average depth is 3–4 feet, however, there are deeper pools that can reach 5–8 feet, usually around the outside of bends.

Tributaries 
From the mouth:
 (left) Little Sturgeon River
 (left) Crumley Creek
 (left) Twin Lakes Creek
 Roberts Lake
 Cochran Lake
 Goose Lake
 (right) Johnson Creek
 Corey Lake
 (left) Beebe Creek
 (right) West Branch Sturgeon River
 (right) Silver Lake
 (left) Allen Creek
 (right) Marl Creek
 (right) Reardon Lake
 (left) Woodin Lake
 Berry Lake
 Fitzek Lake
 Hoffman Lake
 Kidney Lake
 (right) Mud Creek
 Mud Lake
 (left) Bradley Creek
 Lance Lake
 Wildwood Lake
 (right) Stewart Creek
 (right) Club Stream
 (left) Pickerel Creek
 Pickerel Lake
 (right) Mossback Creek

References 

Rivers of Michigan
Rivers of Otsego County, Michigan
Rivers of Cheboygan County, Michigan
Rivers of Charlevoix County, Michigan
Tributaries of Lake Huron